{{DISPLAYTITLE:C17H26N2O}}
The molecular formula C17H26N2O (molar mass: 274.40 g/mol) may refer to:

 5-MeO-DPT, a hallucinogenic drug
 5-Methoxy-diisopropyltryptamine
 Phenampromide
 Ropivacaine

Molecular formulas